Tony Osoba (born 15 March 1947) is a Scottish actor best known for his role as Jim 'Jock' McLaren in the 1970s British sitcom Porridge alongside Ronnie Barker. He also guest starred in the first episode of the spin-off Going Straight. Osoba was the first mixed-race Scottish actor to appear on primetime television when he appeared in the series.

Since then, he has appeared twice in Coronation Street, first as Wesley McGregor in 1982, and secondly as Mike Baldwin's boss Peter Ingram for a few episodes in 1990, before the character was killed off.  He also starred as Chas Jarvis in Dempsey and Makepeace.

Early life
Born in Maryhill, Glasgow, Scotland, he had an early ambition to design cars but when he realised that the employment opportunities in that field were limited, he decided to become an actor after his Highers and trained at the Royal Scottish Academy of Music and Drama. He then joined a theatre company in Richmond, toured abroad and was a member of the Royal Shakespeare Company.

Career
His other television roles include Det. Sgt. Charles 'Chas' Jarvis in Dempsey and Makepeace (1984–1986) and both Wesley McGregor and Peter Ingram in Coronation Street (1982 and 1990). He has also appeared in Space: 1999 (1976), The Professionals (1978), Charles Endell Esq (1979), Minder (1980), The Flame Trees of Thika (1981), Tales of the Unexpected (1982), Bergerac (1983), Between the Lines (1994), Taggart (1999) and Dinotopia (2002) as well as three appearances in Doctor Who in the stories "Destiny of the Daleks" (1979), "Dragonfire" (1987) and "Kill the Moon" (2014). His film career includes roles in Pure as a Lily (1976), the film version of Porridge (US: Doing Time, 1979), Game for Vultures (1979), and Who Dares Wins (1982).

In 2005, Osoba starred as the Kralahome in a UK touring production of The King and I. Later credits include the 2007 film Tanner, as Superintendent Smith in Hollyoaks and Charlie Dokes in The Bill. In 2011 Osoba made a brief appearance in an episode of The Shadow Line.

Osoba has also appeared in one radio series, Space Force (1984–1985), as Loderick Sincere.

Filmography

References

External links
 
 
 

1947 births
Living people
Black British male actors
Scottish male television actors
Scottish male soap opera actors
Scottish male musical theatre actors
Male actors from Glasgow
People educated at Eastwood High School, Newton Mearns
Alumni of the Royal Conservatoire of Scotland
People from Maryhill
Scottish people of Nigerian descent